Christian Atoki Ileka (born 12 September 1960) was the ambassador of the Democratic Republic of the Congo to France from 2011 to 2018. He was named to that position in October 2011, three weeks after the death of his predecessor Myra Ndjoku. He had previously served since 2001 as the Permanent Representative of the RDC to the United Nations.

Born in Kinshasa, Ilea's diplomatic career began in 1985 when he worked as the First Secretary of the embassy of Zaire in Athens. He has worked in his home country for the Ministry of Foreign Affairs and was a human rights observer in Haiti.

Ileka attended the Catholic University in Leuven, Belgium. He is married and has five children.

References

External links
 

Living people
1960 births
People from Kinshasa
Université catholique de Louvain alumni
Ambassadors of the Democratic Republic of the Congo to France
Permanent Representatives of the Democratic Republic of the Congo to the United Nations
Democratic Republic of the Congo diplomats
Government ministers of the Democratic Republic of the Congo
21st-century Democratic Republic of the Congo people